"Eddie My Love" is a 1956 doo wop song. According to BMI and ASCAP, the song was written by Maxwell Davis (BMI), Aaron Collins, Jr. (ASCAP), and Sam Ling (BMI). Maxwell Davis played sax on the Teen Queens record. Aaron Collins was the brother of the Teen Queens. Sam Ling was an alias of Saul Bihari, co-founder of Modern, RPM, and other labels.

The Teen Queens were the first to record the song, released on RPM in 1956. It became their biggest selling single, with several follow up records failing to generate the same success. The Chordettes and The Fontane Sisters also released hit versions of "Eddie My Love" in 1956. According to one critic, Jim Jacobs and Warren Casey adapted the song into the number, "Freddy, My Love", for the 1971 musical Grease.

Chart performance
The song reached No. 13 on the Cash Box Top 50 Best Selling Records chart, in a tandem ranking of the Teen Queens, the Chordettes, the Fontane Sisters, and Lillian Briggs's versions, with the Teen Queens, the Chordettes, and the Fontane Sisters' versions marked as bestsellers, while reaching No. 8 on Cash Boxs chart of "The Ten Records Disk Jockeys Played Most This Week", and No. 12 on Cash Boxs Top Ten Juke Box Tunes chart. The song also reached No. 10 on Billboards Honor Roll of Hits, with the Teen Queens, the Chordettes, and the Fontane Sisters' versions listed as best sellers.

The Teen Queens version was ranked No. 17 in Cash Boxs ranking of "1956's Top R&B Records as Voted in the Cash Box Poll".

The Teen Queens version

The Chordettes version

The Fontane Sisters version

External links
 List of recordings at AllMusic

References

1956 singles
1956 songs
The Chordettes songs
The Fontane Sisters songs
RPM Records (United States) singles